Arthur Arnold Millard (1869 – after 1891) was an English professional footballer born in Birmingham who played in the Football Alliance for Small Heath. Millard had a good goalscoring record before joining Small Heath. In his three games in the Football Alliance and one in the FA Cup Millard scored three goals, but he returned to local football at the end of the 1891–92 season.

References

1869 births
Year of death missing
Footballers from Birmingham, West Midlands
English footballers
Association football forwards
Birmingham City F.C. players
Football Alliance players
Date of birth missing
Place of death missing